Intereconomía TV (commonly referred as "Intereconomía") is a Spanish television network centered on political and economic news from a right-wing political point of view. However, in 2010, Intereconomía TV has renewed its content and is now a national television channel; because of this, in 2010 Intereconomía Corporation has created Intereconomía Business, a channel dedicated to economic and financial news.

Intereconomía TV currently has programs including news (Crónica 1, Crónica 2), politics (El gato al agua), health (+ Vivir), travel (Vuelta y vuelta), entertainment (Lista de bodas) and sports (Punto pelota). It has also incorporated dating shows (Dando caña).

These new programs have brought Intereconomía TV 1.2% of the television share in Spain in June 2010, a historical record of a new channel.

Due to economic mismanagement, now Intereconomía TV is asking for money in a savings account to viewers.

See also
Television in Spain
Sociedad Gestora de Televisión Net TV
Intereconomía TV (Spanish)

Notes

External links
www.eltorotv.com 

Conservatism in Spain
Television stations in Spain
Television channels and stations established in 2005
2005 establishments in Spain
Spanish-language television stations